John G. Thomas (born January 19, 1948) is an American filmmaker. He has been in the film and television business for over 30 years.

A graduate of the USC Film School in production plus a Masters in screenwriting, he has produced and directed dozens of documentaries, feature films and commercials. Among his feature credits are such films as Tin Man, Arizona Heat, Banzai Runner, Healer and most recently, Hamal 18.

Early life
Thomas spent most of his early life on the sea, near his home town of Coral Gables, Florida. At the age of 14, Thomas was proficient enough in boating to be the youngest person to sail from Florida to the Bahamas. By age 15, he was hitch-hiking across the United States, Mexico, and Canada.

Afterwards, he became fascinated with cameras, and began to work in still photography. Soon after, he was selling photos to the local newspaper and regional magazine. By his late teens, Thomas not only produced a local weekly radio show, but also worked as a cameraman for television stations and designed lighting for Miami nightclubs. He even organized a large rock concert starring The Byrds, Steppenwolf, and others. Thomas also became involved in local productions including such projects as Flipper (1964 TV Series) and Gentle Ben (1967 TV series) by Ivan Tors. Too young to legally work, Thomas was often paid under-the-table for doing jobs nobody else wanted to do. This sparked Thomas' passion in film, and soon after graduating high school he moved to Hollywood.

At the USC School of Cinematic Arts, Thomas struggled alongside other to-be-famous film students like George Lucas, Ron Howard, and John Carpenter. After years of facing the constant threat of being kicked out, Thomas was one of five out of four hundred beginning students who graduated.

Career

Early career
Thomas, unlike his peers, focused on Documentary film instead of the feature favored by his peers. Over the next decade, he made 37 documentaries, shorts, and television programs on a varied range of subjects such as aviation, genetic engineering, solar energy, and bluegrass music. He also photographed a land speed record attempt by Kitty O'Neil. During this period, he received many national and international awards for his work. His films were also shown at the Whitehouse and the Vatican. However, in 1983, Thomas decided to give feature films a shot.

His first feature, Tin Man (1983), is the story of a deaf computer genius (Timothy Bottoms) who invents a computer which allows him to speak. The film was received with much enthusiasm and earned the title of Official U.S. entry at the San Sebastian International Film Festival. Thomas' next feature, Banzai Runner (1987), starring Dean Stockwell, centers around the death of a cop mixed up in a race involving a group of wealthy drivers and custom high-speed cars on a deserted desert highway. Banzai Runner went on to become the "…top selling (non-studio) video in the first year of its release." according to Variety. The next film done by Thomas was Arizona Heat (1988), a film crossing cultural boundaries by pairing a tough cop with a lesbian cop in their mutual pursuit of a serial killer. Arizona Heat was also greatly successful.

Breaking from film
Tired from the grind of production, Thomas dropped out of filmmaking for three years. During this, Thomas faced emotional difficulties of having to put his mother into a rest home. The experience led to the eventual production of his next film, Healer (1994). A true story that chronicles the bizarre and often humorous lives of two paramedics in a retirement town. Earning the spot of opening night selection at the Santa Barbara International Film Festival, the films stars such actors as Tyrone Power Jr., David McCallum, Delane Matthews, and Turhan Bey. Tobey Maguire also makes an appearance in the film.

Thomas then took another break and worked in Los Angeles at the Department of Children Protection Services. Contracted by IBM, Thomas witnessed juvenile justice and observed many cases of child abuse. For his work, he received a Commendation from the Los Angeles County Board of Supervisors. Thomas felt enriched by this experience and was inspired to once again work in film. Immediately attracted to the script, Thomas created his next film Hamal 18. This story follows a detective as he searches for a pedophile on the internet.

Aside from creating films, Thomas also programmed specialized budgeting software for feature films, called Easy Budget. This program, developed from Thomas' own production experience, is sold all across the world.

Recent years
Thomas writes scripts for distributors and production companies as a script doctor. Thomas' writing work extends from The Los Angeles Times and The Hollywood Reporter, to VOA and NPR.

Thomas published his first book "Making the Tin Man: How I Made My First Feature Film."  This first-hand account records the trials and tribulations Thomas experienced when making his first feature film.

Thomas teaches filmmaking techniques at several colleges, universities, and local high schools. Most recently, Thomas acquired his master's degree in screenwriting, and is a recognized expert in the area of internet child safety.

Personal life
Today, Thomas enjoys spending much of his time with his wife and two daughters.

Thomas has a passion for flying, being an instrument-rated pilot. He is also an active member in his community, participating in programs that deliver Christmas gifts to underprivileged children.

Works
Producer:
 Hamal 18 (2004)
 Healer (1994)
 Caged in Paradiso (1990)
 Arizona Heat (1988)
 Banzai Runner (1987)
 Tin Man (1983)

Director:
 Hamal 18 (2004)
 Healer (1994)
 Arizona Heat (1988)
 Banzai Runner (1987)
 Tin Man (1983)

Editor:
 Hamal 18 (2004)

Writer:
 Banzai Runner (1987)

References

External links

Living people
1948 births
American film producers
Place of birth missing (living people)